Notebook Paper is the debut studio album by American rapper Huey. It was released on June 19, 2007 via Hitz Committee/Jive/Zomba Records. Production was handled by several record producers, including Jazze Pha, StarGate, T-Mix and T-Pain. It features guest appearances from Asia Cruise, Diamond, Kydd Trell, Bow Wow, Lloyd, MeMpHiTz, T-Pain, Trey Songz and Yo Gotti.

The album garnered mixed reviews from critics pointing out the overall obviousness throughout the production and track listing. It debuted at number 26 on the Billboard 200 and spawned two singles: "Pop, Lock & Drop It" and "When I Hustle". The former peaked at number six on the Billboard Hot 100 and became Huey's only hit.

Critical reception 

AllMusic editor David Jeffries said that despite repeated mentions of the Hitz Committee label and Huey being held back as a rapper, he praised the variety of different styles used throughout the track listing, saying they sound "more like highlights than missed opportunities". He concluded that, "While more outside help might have shown them the way to something stunning, it's a testament to Huey and the Hitz Committee team that they made a rewarding rather than just promising debut out of some everyday beats and ideas". Steve Juon of RapReviews commended the production and "radio ready" tracks but found the overall record to be "rather obvious" with said tracks and the various topics it speaks about, saying that, "[I]f you're looking through Huey's notebook to find anything deep or substantive then disappointment is bound to ensue. [...] the feeling overall is that this album was carefully packaged and planned in a corporate record label's hitmaking factory".

Commercial performance 
The album debuted at number 26 on the Billboard 200 with 29,000 copies sold in its first week. It dropped thirty-six spots to number 62 the next week and placed number 89 the week after.

Track listing

Japanese edition (bonus track)

Personnel

Lawrence Franks Jr. – main artist, executive producer
Latrell "Kydd Trell" Weaver – featured artist (track 5)
Mickey "MeMpHiTz" Wright Jr. – featured artist (track 7), executive producer, A&R
Brittany Nicole Carpentero – featured artist (track 8)
Mario Sentell Giden Mims – featured artist (track 8)
Lloyd Polite Jr. – featured artist (track 10)
Asia Nalani Vernimo – featured artist (track 11)
Tremaine Aldon Neverson – featured artist (track 12)
Faheem Rasheed Najm – featured artist (tracks: 13, 14), producer (track 13), recording (tracks: 11, 13)
Shad Gregory Moss – featured artist (track 14)
Carlton McClendon – keyboards (track 6)
Aaron Clay – guitar (track 10)
Ryan "Key" Belcher – producer (track 1a)
Ruben "Laudie" Gonzalez – producer (tracks: 1b, 3, 5, 7), recording (track 7)
Dennis Preston Jr. – producer (track 2)
D'Andre "Po Po" Smith – producer (tracks: 4, 14)
Calvin Miller – additional producer (tracks: 4, 14)
Jamil Debardlabon – producer (track 6)
John Wesley – producer (tracks: 7, bonus)
Robert Crawford – producer (track 8)
Demario Hammonds – producer (track 8)
Triston "T-Mix" Jones – producer (track 9)
Phalon Anton Alexander – producer (track 10)
Ashley J. Bell – producer (track 11)
Mikkel Storleer Eriksen – producer & recording (track 12)
Tor Erik Hermansen – producer (track 12)
Howard "Ross" Vanderslice – recording (tracks: 1a, 14)
Danny Ogle – recording (track 1b), assistant recording (track 9)
Justin Trawick – assistant recording (tracks: 1b, 9)
Chris Robinson – recording (tracks: 2, 5)
Marc “Matrix” DuPain – assistant recording (tracks: 2, 5)
Matt Sawicki – recording (tracks: 3, 4)
Ralph Cacciurri – recording (tracks: 6, 8)
Rich Tapper – recording (track 7)
Leo Goff – recording (track 8)
Nico Solis – recording (tracks: 9-11)
Mike Wilson – recording (track 9)
James "Scrappy" Stassen – recording (track 13)
Travis Daniels – recording (track 14)
Leslie Brathwaite – mixing (tracks: 1, 4, 6-8, 10, 14)
John Frye – mixing (tracks: 1, 2, 5)
Fabian Marasciullo – mixing (tracks: 9, 13)
Phil Tan – mixing (tracks: 11, 12)
Kori Anders – assistant mixing (tracks: 1, 4, 6-8, 10, 14)
Gary Fly – assistant mixing (tracks: 1, 2, 5)
Douglas Sadler – assistant mixing (tracks: 9, 13)
Josh Houghkirk – assistant mixing (tracks: 11, 12)
Brian Gardner – mastering
Rico Washingston – management

Charts

References

External links

2007 debut albums
Jive Records albums
Huey (rapper) albums
Albums produced by T-Pain
Albums produced by Stargate
Albums produced by Jazze Pha